Ogonek (Russian: Огонёк) is a Russian song about the separation of a man and his girlfriend during The Great Patriotic War. The song's title can be translated as 'a fire.'

History
The theme and lyrics of Ogonek can be traced back to a poem written in 1942 by Mikhail Isakovsky, who later composed the lyrics of the song. The music was written by Matvey Blanter. The song was popularized during World War II, as many Soviet soldiers had access to an accordion, and when they rested, they would often play patriotic and emotional songs. This song in particular caught on with the Russian people, and made it very popular.

Popularity in Japan
The song was very popular in Japan, where it was known as 'Tomosetsu'. (Japanese: 友説) It caught popularity along with the song Katyusha, representative of The Singing Voice of Japan, a musical-political movement in Japan, along with a musical cafe opening in 1955, using this song as branding.

Lyrics

Russian songs